Passengers per hour per direction (p/h/d), passengers per hour in peak direction (pphpd) or corridor capacity is a measure of the route capacity of a rapid transit or public transport system.

Definition
 

The corridor capacity in the passenger transport field refers to the maximum number of people which can be safely and comfortably transported per unit of time over a certain way with a defined width. 
The corridor capacity does not measure the number of vehicles which can be transported over such way, since the nuclear objective of passenger mobility is to transport passengers, not vehicles. 

An approximately equivalent concept in physics is volumetric flux.

Directional flow

Many public transport systems handle a high directional flow of passengers— often traveling to work in a city in the morning rush hour and away from the said city in the late afternoon. 
To increase the passenger throughput, many systems can be reconfigured to change the direction of the optimized flow. 
A common example is a railway or metro station with more than two parallel escalators, where the majority of the escalators can be set to move in one direction. 
This gives rise to the measure of the peak-flow rather than a simple average of half of the total capacity.

See also

References

Public transport
Temporal rates
Transportation planning
Units of temporal rate